Dichomeris bisignellus is a moth in the family Gelechiidae. It was described by Snellen in 1885. It is found in India, on Sulawesi and eastern Africa.

References

Moths described in 1885
bisignellus